The Greater Shanghai Plan was a 1927 plan for the city of Shanghai, China, drawn up by the Nationalist Government of the Republic of China in 
Nanking. It was presented at the 123rd meeting of the Shanghai City Government in July 1929 and as one of its provisions allocated 7,000mu (~4.6km2) in the modern day Jiangwan Subdistrict of Shanghai's Yangpu District for the construction of a government headquarters and administration centre. Had it been completed, the government headquarters building would have stood close to the junction of today's Hengren Road (恒仁路) and the Qingyuan Ring Road (清源环路).

Following the fall of Shanghai to the Japanese in 1937, implementation of the plan stopped. By October 1938, the occupying army had come up with their own "Greater Shanghai Metropolitan Plan", which was a modified version of the original. When the war ended in 1945 with the Japanese surrender, the Nationalist Government returned to power. It did not continue with the plan but instead constructed a number of new roads and repaired damaged buildings. From then until 1952, land previously allocated under the plan was gradually subsumed by development of the Jiangwan District.

Background 
In July 1927, the Nationalist Government headquartered in Nanking under Chiang Kai-shek established the Shanghai Special City Government (上海特别市政府). The city remained remarkably prosperous despite tripartite struggles between Nationalist, Communist and warlord factions in various parts of China, largely on the account of the International Settlement and the French Concession. The Nationalist-controlled Chinese walled city in the Nanshi area (南市) and the northern Zhabei District were small in comparison to the areas under foreign administration, held a burgeoning population and were unsuitable for expansion. As a result, the Nanking Government considered large scale redevelopment a key task and in July 1929 decided to proceed with the acquisition of land northeast of the city adjacent to the Huangpu River. In 1922, this area had also been earmarked by Sun Yat-sen, founder of the Chinese Republic, as the center of China's development plans with a view to Shanghai becoming a global commercial centre. By 1931, the new Shanghai Special City Government had approved and started work on the Greater Shanghai Plan, utilising ideas drawn from British expert Ebenezer Howard's 1902 book Garden Cities of Tomorrow. The grid layout also followed contemporary trends in European and American urban planning.

Plan detail 
The major elements of the plan were divided into four sections:

 City center plan: Comprising 1,000mu (~ 0.66km2) and shaped like the stylized Chinese character zhong (中) meaning "centre", this area would contain government buildings each with its own exercise area. There would also have been a museum, a library, a hospital and a sports stadium suitable for staging national events.
 A railway line connecting the city centre with a port on the Huangpu River and a railway line with goods depot near modern-day Qiujiang Road. 
 Division of the city into zones with the central area surrounded by industrial and residential areas. 
 Traffic system:
 A grid of high speed roads leading out from the central government buildings in the centre to the west and south with a web of interconnected roads to the north and east.
 Construction of Zhongshan North (中山北路) and Zhongshan West Road (中山西路) leading to the southern downtown area and Qimei Road (其美路), modern day Siping Road, (四平路) and Huangxing Road (黄兴路) connecting to the International Settlement in the north west.
 A further 23 roads leading to Pudong, Jiangqiao and other local areas.

Implementation

Funding 
Once implementation of the plan began, the Nationalist Government issued bonds to cover the necessary construction funds. In 1929 they floated the First Phase Municipal Bond to raise 3,000,000 Chinese yuan based on marketable land values of between 200 and 600 yuan per Chinese acre. A land tax was further levied on the 5,400 mu that made up the proposed city centre area. Outside of this area, a surplus 829 mu of land was divided into two grades and sold for 2,500 yuan and 2,000 yuan per mu respectively, generating a profit of 1,795,560 yuan.

New city hall 

The 1,000 mu site earmarked for the new Shanghai City Hall lay at the centre of the planned city. On 1October 1929 a design competition for the new building was launched with a prize of 3,000 yuan. The government announced architect Dong Dayou (董大酉) as the winner in February 1930 while further amendments were made to the overall plan. Work officially began on the site in June 1931 and was scheduled for completion the following year. However, Chinese nationalist forces clashed with the Japanese army in the January 28 Incident as Shanghai came under attack and the area between the Wujiaochang District (the modern day Yangpu District) and the Huangpu River, at the heart of the construction project, became a battlefield. Work ceased until the announcement of a ceasefire in March 1932 then in July the project restarted and was formally completed on 10October. The new complex opened at the end of the year.

Other facilities 
Work on a 300 mu (~200,000 m2) sports field began in August 1934 at the same time as a stadium and a swimming pool nearby. At the end of the same year, construction started on the Shanghai Municipal Library (上海市立图书馆) and the Shanghai Municipal Museum (上海市立博物馆), both designed by Dong Dayou.

Notable buildings 
 Shanghai Nationalist Government Building
 Shanghai Municipal Stadium (Now the Jiangwan Sports Center)
 Shanghai Municipal Library
 Shanghai Municipal Museum
 Shanghai Municipal Hospital and Health Institute

Denoument 
The area suffered significant damage during World War II and thereafter the development focus shifted towards the southwest of Shanghai.

Notes

References

Further reading

External links 
 大上海计划与江湾建筑(组图) The Greater Shanghai Plan and the Construction of Jiangwan (Photos)

20th century in Shanghai